Gladys the Swiss Dairy Cow, also known simply as "Gladys", is a work of public art in the U.S. state of Connecticut. Gladys was created and is maintained by artist/owner James Lebinski since August 2002.  The underlying sculpture is a fiberglass Swiss dairy cow, and is the same shape and size as the famous CowParade cows.

Lebinski has created more than 50 pieces of art using the sculpture by decorating it with paint, cloth, and various other materials for each holiday. Gladys was displayed in Fairfield, Connecticut, from October 2002 until April 2006, and can currently be found in Monroe, Connecticut.

History

In July 2002, Lebinski recovered a fiberglass cow sculpture from a Dumpster in Norwalk, Connecticut. Lebinski repaired the sculpture's smashed body and four broken legs and painted it pink. Gladys was placed on display in Fairfield, Connecticut in August 2002. The sculpture became an object of attention and resulted in suggestions to the artist to create whimsical seasonal designs using the sculpture as a base.

Early development

In 2002, the first seasonal artwork using the sculpture was titled  "Gladys as a Skeleton", and was created for Halloween. A significant amount of public attention was generated by this artwork, and this attention was the genesis of the ongoing project to create holiday-themed art. 
The next piece was created for Christmas 2002. The cow sculpture was painted as Santa Claus and the artwork was titled "Gladys as Santa Cow". These two works gained public attention and generated initial press coverage.

2003
The ongoing creation of works based on the cow sculpture continued in 2003. 
The first work for the cow sculpture in 2003 was for Valentine's Day and was titled "Gladys as a Valentine". Next, in March 2003, the cow sculpture was converted to "Gladys as a Leprechaun". The use of a single prop was in keeping with using paint as a primary medium.

In April 2003, the media used to create the art was expanded to include additional props and attachments.

In May 2003, the cow sculpture was converted into "Gladys as Uncle Sam". The art was then incorporated into a parade float for the 2003 Fairfield Memorial Day Parade. This was the first large-scale public exhibition of the work. As a result, the work was awarded "Best Appearing Float—Service Club" by the 2003 Fairfield Memorial Day Parade Committee.

In July 2003, the cow sculpture was converted into "Gladys in an Itsy-Bitsy Teenie-Weenie Yellow Polka Dot Bikini". The use of props was expanded to include props that were not physically attached to the sculpture.

In August 2003, the cow sculpture was converted to art with a first-day-of school motif. The work "Gladys as a School Bus" represented the first piece that was designed to closely resemble a real-life object, and was achieved in a paint-only medium.

In October 2003, the cow sculpture was converted into "Gladys as a Scarecrow", inspired by The Wizard of Oz. This marked the first complete departure from the sculpture as a painted work. The use of straw, natural fiber, burlap, and organic materials was incorporated to achieve a fall motif. 

In December 2003, the cow sculpture was converted into a Christmas theme: "Gladys as a Reindeer". This work was featured in a multi-page article in the Fairfield Citizen-News.

2004

  
In February 2004, the sculpture was converted into "Gladys as a Valentine Bride".

In March 2004, the cow sculpture was converted into a Saint Patrick's Day work. The rainbow colors were true to the Roy G. Biv color spectrum of a rainbow. Ultimately, a pot of gold prop was added, along with a second piece of public art titled "Sophie as a Leprechaun" to clarify the "pot-of-gold-at-the-end-of-the-rainbow" theme.

For Easter in April 2004, the sculpture was transformed into a work of art that featured an Easter bonnet prop, and multiple painted Easter eggs with individual images.

In May 2004, the Uncle Sam motif was re-created, representing the first time a work was repeated. The art was featured as an entry in the 2004 Fairfield Memorial Day Parade. The work was awarded "honorable mention" by the 2004 Fairfield Memorial Day Committee.

In August 2004, the cow sculpture was transformed into a tribute to the Fairfield Fire Department, Station 2. The work incorporated memorial logos for the Worcester 6, and 9/11 FDNY. The firefighters' union logo and Irish firefighter logo were also reproduced.

In October 2004, the cow sculpture was converted into "Gladys as Dracula". Additionally, an Ogden Nash poem was incorporated on a tombstone prop.

In December 2004, the cow sculpture was converted into a lighted Christmas tree. The use of additional props was expanded to incorporate day-visible ornaments, presents, and a Christmas tree, as well as night-visible multicolored lights.

2005
In January 2005, the cow sculpture was converted into "Gladys as a Mardi Gras Jester".

In April 2005, the cow sculpture, was designed in a Spring/Easter scheme and represented the first use of a sponge painting technique to achieve the green grass effect, with sufficient fading to deliver a suitable image.

The next work based on the cow sculpture was "Gladys as an Animal Control Vehicle" in tribute to the Fairfield Police Department Animal Control Department.

In December 2005, the cow sculpture was used to create "Gladys as a Shepherd". The primary medium was blue and white textured cotton cloth.

2006
In January 2006, the cow sculpture was converted to "Gladys as a Cow". The motif was a black and white spotted cow.

In April 2006, the sculpture was placed on display in Monroe, Connecticut.

In October 2006, the cow sculpture was painted as "Gladys as a Skeleton" and was incorporated into Gaffney's Ghoulish House, a charity food drive with a halloween haunted house theme.

2007
In December 2007, the cow sculpture was placed on display as "Gladys as Santa Claus". Along with Gladys, "Goldie the Cow" was created and decorated as a reindeer, and Sophie the Pig was created and decorated as an elf.

Gladys

See also
United Buddy Bears

References 

Alexis P. Harrison  "Feeling Right at Home" The Fairfield Citizen News, Volume 34 No. 97, December 5, 2003
"Where in Monroe"  The Monroe Courier, Wednesday August 23, 2006

Further reading 
 
 
 

Tourist attractions in Fairfield County, Connecticut
American folk art
Outdoor sculptures in Connecticut
Buildings and structures in Fairfield County, Connecticut
Fiberglass sculptures in the United States
2002 sculptures
Cattle in art
Sculptures of bovines